Diospyros attenuata is a species of tree in the ebony family, Ebenaceae. It is endemic to Sri Lanka. This tree has been found to occur in only three forest reserves during the extensive National Conservation Review forest surveys.

References

attenuata
Endemic flora of Sri Lanka
Trees of Sri Lanka
Endangered flora of Asia